Pastel de nata ( (plural: pastéis de nata;)) is a Portuguese egg custard tart pastry, optionally dusted with cinnamon. Outside Portugal, they are particularly popular in other parts of Western Europe, Asia and former Portuguese colonies, such as Brazil, Mozambique, Macau, Goa and East Timor. The Macanese pastel de nata was also adopted by KFC and is available in regions such as Hong Kong, Taiwan and China. In Indonesia, this pastry is especially popular in Kampung Tugu, Jakarta, a culturally Portuguese (Mardijker) enclave.

History
Pastéis de nata were created before the 18th century by Catholic monks at the Hieronymites Monastery in the civil parish of Saint Mary of Bethlehem, in Lisbon. At the time, convents and monasteries used large quantities of egg-whites for starching clothes, such as friars and nuns' religious habits. It was quite common for monasteries and convents to use the leftover egg yolks to make cakes and pastries, resulting in the proliferation of sweet pastry recipes throughout the country.

In the aftermath of the Liberal Revolution of 1820, following the dissolution of religious orders and in the face of the impending closure of many convents and monasteries, the monks started selling pastéis de nata at a nearby sugar refinery to bring in revenue. In 1834, the monastery was closed and the recipe sold to the sugar refinery, whose owners in 1837 opened the Fábrica de Pastéis de Belém. The descendants own the business to this day.

Since the opening of Fábrica de Pastéis de Belém, the original recipe of the pastel de nata is kept in a secret room. The Fábrica de Pastéis de Belém is the most popular place to buy pastéis de nata; the shop is located just a short three-minute walk from the Jerónimos Monastery.  The shop offers both takeout and sit-in services and sells over 20,000 pastéis de nata a day. Usually the tart is sprinkled with canela (cinnamon), and often accompanied with a bica (a strong espresso coffee). 

In 2009 The Guardian listed pastéis de Belém as one of the 50 "best things to eat" in the world. In 2011, following the result of a public vote, the pastry was announced as one of Portugal's Seven Wonders of Gastronomy, further cementing it as one of the country's most popular national dishes.

Pastel de nata abroad 

The cuisine of Japan was influenced by Portuguese traders during the 16th century, and culturally important Japanese baked goods including pan (from Portuguese pão, bread) and castella have their origins in this period. Pastel de nata is one of these. In addition to the traditional form of the pastry, some variations have been developed especially for the Japanese market by adding green tea flavoring. This green tea pastel de nata was eventually exported to South Korea and other Asian markets.

See also 
 Torta de nata
 Egg tart
 List of egg dishes

Notes

References

Sources

External links

 Official website of Pastéis de Belém

Portuguese cuisine
Portuguese desserts
Tarts
Custard desserts
Egg dishes
Kue
Brazilian desserts
Macanese cuisine
East Timorese cuisine
Indonesian desserts